A party is a gathering of people who have been invited by a host for the purposes of socializing, conversation, recreation, or as part of a festival or other commemoration or celebration of a special occasion. A party will often feature food and beverages, and often conversation, music, dancing, or other forms of entertainment. 

Some parties are held in honor of a specific person, day, or event, such as a birthday party, a Super Bowl party, or a St. Patrick’s Day party. Parties of this kind are often called celebrations. A party is not necessarily a private occasion. Public parties are sometimes held in restaurants, pubs, beer gardens, nightclubs, or bars, and people attending such parties may be charged an admission fee by the host. Large parties in public streets may celebrate events such as Mardi Gras or the signing of a peace treaty ending a long war.

Types

Balls

Banquets

Birthday party

A birthday party is a celebration of the anniversary of the birth of the person who is being honored. While there is historical precedent for birthday parties for the rich and powerful throughout history, the tradition extended to middle-class Americans around the nineteenth century, and took on more modern norms and traditions in the twentieth century. Birthday parties are now a feature of many cultures.

In Western cultures, birthday parties include a number of common rituals. The guests may be asked to bring a gift for the honored person. Party locations are often decorated with colorful decorations, such as balloons and streamers. A birthday cake is usually served with lit candles that are to be blown out after a "birthday wish" has been made. The person being honored will be given the first piece of cake. While the birthday cake is being brought to the table, the song "Happy Birthday to You" or some other birthday song is sung by the guests.

At parties for children, time is often taken for the "gift opening" wherein the individual whose birthday is celebrated opens each of the gifts brought. It is also common at children's parties for the host to give parting gifts to the attendees in the form of "goodie bags". Children and even adults sometimes wear colorful cone-shaped party hats.

Birthday parties are often larger and more extravagant if they celebrate someone who has reached what is regarded in the culture as a milestone age, such as transition from childhood to adulthood. Examples of traditional coming of age celebrations include the North American sweet sixteen party and the Latin American quinceañera.

Surprise party

A surprise party is a party that is not made known beforehand to the person in whose honor it is being held.

Birthday surprise parties are the most common kind of surprise party. At most such parties, the guests will arrive an hour or so before the honoree arrives. Often, a friend in on the surprise will lead the honoree to the location of the party without letting on anything.

The guests might even conceal themselves from view, and when the honoree enters the room, they leap from hiding and all shout, "Surprise!" For some surprise birthday parties, it is considered to be a good tactic to shock the honoree. Streamers, silly string, and balloons may be used for this purpose. Evidence of a party, such as decorations and balloons, are not made visible from the exterior of the home, so that the honoree will suspect nothing.

Dinner party

A dinner party is a social gathering at which people eat dinner together, usually in the host's home. At the most formal dinner parties, the dinner is served on a dining table with place settings. Dinner parties are often preceded by a cocktail hour in a living room or bar, where guests drink cocktails while mingling and conversing. Wine is usually served throughout the meal, often with a different wine accompanying each course.

At less formal dinner parties, a buffet is provided. Guests choose food from the buffet and eat while standing up and conversing. Women guests may wear cocktail dresses; men may wear blazers.

At some informal dinner parties, the host may ask guests to bring food or beverages (a main dish, a side dish, a dessert, or appetizers). A party of this type is called a potluck or potluck dinner. In the United States, potlucks are very often held in churches and community centers.

Garden party
A garden party is a party in a park or a garden. An event described as a garden party is usually more formal than other outdoor gatherings, which may be called simply parties, picnics, barbecues, etc. A garden party can be a prestigious event. For example, invitations by the British Sovereign to garden parties at Buckingham Palace or at the Palace of Holyroodhouse (in Scotland) are considered an honor. The President of France holds a garden party at the Palais de l'Elysée in Paris on Bastille Day.

Cocktail party

A cocktail party is a party at which cocktails are served. It is sometimes called a "cocktail reception". Women who attend a cocktail party may wear a cocktail dress. A cocktail hat is sometimes worn as a fashion statement.

Tea party

In Anglo-American culture, a tea party is a formal gathering for afternoon tea. These parties were traditionally attended only by women, but men may also be invited. Tea parties are often characterized by the use of prestigious tableware, such as bone china and silver. The table, whatever its size or cost, is made to look its prettiest, with cloth napkins and matching cups and plates.

In addition to tea, larger parties may serve punch or, in cold weather, hot chocolate. The tea is accompanied by a variety of easily managed foods. Thin sandwiches such as cucumber or tomato, bananas, cake slices, buns, and cookies are all common choices.

Reception

Formal receptions are parties that are designed to receive a large number of guests, often at prestigious venues such as Buckingham Palace, the White House, or Government Houses of the British Empire and Commonwealth. The hosts and any guests of honor form a receiving line in order of precedence near the entrance. Each guest is announced to the host who greets each one in turn as he or she arrives. Each guest properly speaks little more than his name (if necessary) and a conventional greeting or congratulation to each person in the receiving line. In this way, the line of guests progresses steadily without unnecessary delay. After formally receiving each guest in this fashion, the hosts may mingle with the guests.

Somewhat less formal receptions are common in academic settings, sometimes to honor a guest lecturer, or to celebrate a special occasion such as retirement of a respected member of staff. Receptions are also common in symposium or academic conference settings, as an environment for attendees to mingle and interact informally. These gatherings may be accompanied by a sit-down dinner, or more commonly, a stand-up informal buffet meal.

Receptions are also held to celebrate exhibition openings at art galleries or museums. The featured artist or artists are often present, as well as the curators who organized the exhibition. In addition or instead, a celebratory reception may be held partway through or at the end of an exhibition run. This alternative scheduling allows guests more time to see the exhibition in depth at their own pace, before meeting the featured guests. Some food is often served, as in academic gatherings.

Refreshments at a reception may be as minimal, such as coffee or lemonade, or as elaborate as those at a state dinner.

Soirées

In the 18th century, in France and England, it became fashionable for wealthy, well married ladies who had a residence "in town" to invite accomplished guests to visit their home in the evening, to partake of refreshments and cultural conversation. Soirées often included refined musical entertainment, and the term is still sometimes used to define a certain sophisticated type of evening party.

Society hostesses included actresses or other women with a larger-than-life reputation. The character of the hostess obviously determined the character of the soirée and the choice of guests.

Famous soirée hostesses include Hester Thrale.

Dances and balls

A dance is a social gathering at which the guests dance. It may be a casual, informal affair, or a structured event, such as a school dance or a charity ball. Dances usually take place during the evening. An afternoon dance is formally known as a tea dance. Some dances feature specific kinds of dancing, such as square dancing.

A ball is a large formal party that features ballroom dancing. Women guests wear ball gowns; men wear evening dress.

Block party

A block party is a public party that is attended by the residents of a specific city block or neighborhood. These parties are typically held in a city street that has been closed to traffic to accommodate the party. At some block parties, attendees are free to pass from house to house, socializing, and often drinking alcoholic beverages.

Costume or fancy dress party
At a masquerade ball, guests wear masks to conceal their identities. Guests at a costume party or a fancy dress party wear costumes. These parties are sometimes associated with holiday events, such as Halloween and Mardi Gras.

Christmas caroling party
In English and American culture during the Christmas season, it is traditional to have a Christmas caroling party. People go from door to door in a neighborhood and sing Christmas carols. Some popular Christmas carols are "We Wish You a Merry Christmas", "Deck the Halls", "The Twelve Days of Christmas", "Frosty the Snowman", "Jingle Bells", "Silver Bells", "Santa Claus Is Coming to Town", and "O Holy Night".

In Spain, this type of party is called El Aguinaldo. It is the same as in England and the United States, but the only difference is that the children who sing the carols are given tips. Christmas songs are called villancicos in Spain; they are mainly sung by children at small parties.

Parties for teenagers and young adults

Dance parties are gatherings in bars or community centers where the guests dance to house music, techno music, or disco. The music for dance parties is usually selected and played by a disc jockey.

A spin-off of dance parties, the rave involves dancing to loud house music, techno music, or industrial music. Rave parties may be attended by as few as a score of people in a basement or, more likely, by a few hundred people in a club, to as many as thousands in a large warehouse, field, or even tens of thousands in a sporting arena, amusement park, or other large space. Raves are associated with illegal drugs such as ecstasy and psychedelic drugs.

A house party is a party where a large group of people get together at a private home to socialize. House parties that involve the drinking of beer pumped from a keg are called keg parties or "keggers." These parties are popular in North America, the United Kingdom, and Australia and are often attended by people under the legal drinking age. Sometimes, even older party-goers run afoul of the law for having provided alcoholic beverages to minors. Arrests may also be made for violating a noise ordinance, for disorderly conduct, and even for operating a "blind pig", an establishment that illegally sells alcoholic beverages.

On college campuses, parties are often hosted by fraternities.

Outdoor parties include bush parties and beach parties. Bush parties (also called "field parties") are held in a secluded area of a forest ("bush"), where friends gather to drink and talk. These parties are often held around a bonfire. Beach parties are held on a sandy shoreline of a lake, river, or sea, and also often feature a bonfire.

School-related parties for teenagers and young adults include proms and graduation parties, which are held in honor of someone who has recently graduated from a school or university.

Pool party

A pool party is a party in which the guests swim in a swimming pool.

Singles dance party and mixer
A singles dance party and mixer is a party which is organized for people who are not married and who want to find a partner for friendship, dating, or sex.

Usually a "mixer game" is played, to make it easy for people to meet each other. For example, each guest may be given a card with an inspiring quotation on it. The game is to find a potential partner who has the same quotation. Couples who have matching cards may be given a small prize.

These parties are sponsored by various organizations, both non-profit and for-profit.

Fundraising party
A fundraising party, or fundraiser, is a party that is held for the purpose of collecting money that will be given to some person or to some institution, such as a school, charity, business, or political campaign. These parties are usually formal and consist of a dinner followed by speeches or by a presentation extolling whatever the money is being raised for.

It is very common to charge an admission fee for parties of this kind. This fee may be as high as several thousand dollars, especially if money is being raised for a political campaign.

Graduation party

In some places, parties to celebrate graduation from school, college, or university are popular. A graduation party may be held on campus or external, and transportation is provided when location is far away.

Marriage-related parties

Bridal shower
Bachelor party (a.k.a. UK: stag night; Australia: Bucks Night)
Bachelorette party (a.k.a. hen night, hen party)
Wedding reception
Divorce party

Showers
A shower is a party whose primary purpose is to give gifts to the guest of honor. Traditionally, a bridal shower is a way for an engaged woman to be "showered" with gifts for her upcoming married life (see hope chest). Guests are expected to bring a small gift related to the upcoming life event. Themed games are a frequent sight at this sort of party. A new twist on the baby shower for a pregnant woman is the gender reveal party, made possible by modern ultrasound technology.

Housewarming party

A housewarming party may be held when a family, couple, or person moves into a new house or apartment. It is an occasion for the hosts to show their new home to their friends. Housewarming parties are typically informal and do not include any planned activities other than a tour of the new house or apartment. Invited family members and friends may bring gifts for the new home.

Welcome party
A welcome party is held for the purpose of welcoming a newcomer, such as a new club member, a new employee, or a family's new baby.

Farewell party
In many cultures, it is customary to throw a farewell party in honor of someone who is moving away or departing on a long trip (sometimes called a bon voyage party). Retirement parties for departing co-workers fall into this category. Several are described in Japan in Shusaku Endo's 1974 novel When I Whistle.

Cast party
A cast party is a celebration following the final performance of a theatrical event, such as a play, a musical, or an opera. A party of this kind may also be held following the end of shooting for a motion picture (called a "wrap party") or after the season's final episode of a television series. Cast parties are traditionally held for most theater performances, both professional and amateur.

Invited guests are usually restricted to performers, crew members, and a few others who did not participate in the performance, such as sponsors and donors who have helped fund the production.

Pre-party
A pre-party is a party that is held immediately before a school dance, a wedding, a birthday party, and a bar mitzvah. These parties are usually of short duration and sometimes involve getting ready for the event (e.g., the guests may put on makeup or costumes). Guests usually leave at the same time and arrive at the event together. Often people engage in pregaming or drinking before an event or a night out, especially if the event lacks access to alcohol.

After-party
An after-party is a party that is held after a wedding, school dance, or other more formal event. Guests are usually limited to friends of the host.

Parties on special days

International

Christmas
Halloween
International Friendship Day
Labour Day
Mardi Gras
Mischief Night
Diwali
New Year's Day
New Year's Eve

Australia
Australia Day
Grand Final Saturday
Melbourne Cup Day (Melbourne metropolitan region only)

Canada
Canada Day
Labour Day
Thanksgiving
Victoria Day

France
Bastille Day
May Day

Germany
German Unity Day
May Day a.k.a. Tag der Arbeit
Reformation Day
Rosenmontag a.k.a. Rose Monday, highlight of the German carnival

India
Diwali
Holi
Dussehra
Indian Independence Day
Republic Day
Chaand Raat (Eid)
Christmas
Labour Day
Many other regional festivals, mostly different Hindu festivals in every state.

Iran and other Persified societies
Nowruz

Ireland
Saint Patrick’s Day

Israel
Passover
Hanukkah
Purim

Mexico
Cinco de Mayo
May Day

New Zealand
Waitangi Day

Pakistan
Pakistan Day
Yom-e-Istiqlal
Basant

Scotland
Hogmanay

Sweden
Midsummer Eve

United Kingdom
Guy Fawkes Night
Labour Day

United States
Independence Day, a.k.a. the Fourth of July
Labor Day
Super Bowl Sunday
Thanksgiving

Uruguay
Nostalgia Night, the night before the Declaration of Independence

Parties associated with religious events

Christian
Christmas
Easter
Mardi Gras
Saint Patrick’s Day
Islamic
Eid al-Adha
Eid ul-Fitr
Jewish
Hanukkah
Passover
Purim

Notable parties

Exotic Erotic Ball
Burning Man
Full Moon Party
Lollapalooza
Nuit Blanche
Woodstock Festival
Soul Clap and Dance-Off

Miscellaneous parties

Game party
A social gathering during which the guests play party games or board games.
LAN party
 A party that involves multi-player computer games and uses a Local Area Network.
Party plan
A form of direct selling, in which a party is used to sell products (for example, a Tupperware party).
Political houseparty
A party that is hosted in a private home for the purpose of supporting a particular candidate, political party, or ballot measure, or to share information and opinions about an upcoming election.
Sleepover party, also called a pajama party or slumber party
A party for which the guests are invited to stay overnight at the home of the host. These parties are usually for teenagers or young children.
Toga party
A party in which the guests wear togas.

Gallery

See also

Cocktail party
Convention (meeting)
Crayfish party
Cuddle party
Divorce party
Drinking culture
Event management
Event planning
Festival
Gate-crashing
Pizza party
Naked party
Rave party
Sex party
Spring break
Wedding party

References

Bibliography

 
Party stores
Social gatherings